Ben Damon (born 24 October 1980) is an Australian journalist, TV presenter and screenwriter/director.

Damon is a TV host who has presented on Foxtel's Olympic coverage, Sunrise, Weekend Today, Sky News Australia, Sky Racing and Fox Sports.

Damon is the face and voice of Main Event's pay-per-view television boxing coverage.

Prior to his resignation, Damon presented the weeknight 6pm sport report for Sydney's edition of Seven News.

Damon also presented the Nine Network's horse racing coverage and was previously on Sports Tonight on Network Ten.

Damon is a filmmaker. His debut feature film won Best Documentary at the London International Film Festival amongst other awards.

Damon is a popular master of ceremonies with the Australian Turf Club and other organisations.

Damon was a finalist in the 2009 Cleo Bachelor of the Year competition.

References

Australian television journalists
Living people
Seven News presenters
1980 births